Dame Geraldine Mary Andrews, DBE (born 19 April 1959), styled The Rt. Hon. Lady Justice Andrews, is a Lady Justice of Appeal of the Court of Appeal of England and Wales.

She was educated at King's College London (LLB with First-class honours, 1980; LLM, 1982; AKC). She was called to the bar at Gray's Inn in 1981 and became a bencher in 2004. She was made a QC in 2001, recorder from 2001, deputy judge of the High Court from 2006 to 2013, and judge of the High Court of Justice (Queen's Bench Division) since 2013.

She was appointed a Lady Justice of Appeal in October 2020.

References

1959 births
Living people
Alumni of King's College London
Associates of King's College London
Members of Gray's Inn
21st-century English judges
Lady Justices of Appeal
Queen's Bench Division judges
Dames Commander of the Order of the British Empire
Members of the Privy Council of the United Kingdom
Place of birth missing (living people)
Fellows of King's College London
English women judges